Emina Bektas and Tara Moore were the defending champions but were defeated by Sophie Chang and Angela Kulikov in the final, 6–3, 6–7(2–7), [10–7].

Seeds

Draw

Draw

References
Main Draw

Georgia's Rome Tennis Open - Doubles